Trigonoptera flavicollis is a species of beetle in the family Cerambycidae. It was described by Stephan von Breuning in 1940.

Subspecies
 Trigonoptera flavicollis stictica Breuning, 1940
 Trigonoptera flavicollis flavicollis Breuning, 1940

References

Tmesisternini
Beetles described in 1940